Muhammad Hussain Khan is a Pakistani politician who had been a Member of the Provincial Assembly of Sindh, from August 2013 to May 2018.

Early life and education
He was born on 1 June 1962 in Mirpurkhas.

He has a degree of Bachelors of Commerce from Sindh University.

Political career

He was elected to the Provincial Assembly of Sindh as a candidate of Mutahida Quami Movement (MQM) from Constituency PS-95 KARACHI-VII in by-polls held in August 2013.

He was re-elected to Provincial Assembly of Sindh as a candidate of MQM from Constituency PS-92 (Korangi Karachi-I) in 2018 Pakistani general election.

References

Living people
Sindh MPAs 2013–2018
1962 births
Muttahida Qaumi Movement MPAs (Sindh)
Sindh MPAs 2018–2023